Joseph Francis Walsh (October 14, 1886 – January 6, 1967), nicknamed "Tweet", was a Major League Baseball catcher. In 5 career games, he had four hits in 13 at-bats, with 2 RBIs. He batted and threw right-handed.

Walsh was born in Minersville, Pennsylvania, and died in Buffalo, New York.

External links
Baseball Reference.com page

1886 births
1967 deaths
New York Highlanders players
Major League Baseball catchers
Baseball players from Pennsylvania
Greensboro Champs players
Rocky Mount Railroaders players
Columbus Senators players
Indianapolis Indians players
Port Huron Independents players
Minor league baseball managers
People from Minersville, Pennsylvania